John Waterhouse may refer to:

 Rev. John Waterhouse, general superintendent of the Wesleyan Missions in Australia and Polynesia, father of George Waterhouse
 John Waterhouse (astronomer) (1806–1879), of Halifax, inventor in 1858 of photographic equipment known as "Waterhouse stops"
 John Waterhouse (headmaster) (1852–1940), Australian educator, grandson of Rev. John Waterhouse, son of Jabez Waterhouse
 John Waterhouse (violinist) (1877–1970), Canadian violinist, conductor, and music educator
 John William Waterhouse (1849–1917), British Pre-Raphaelite painter
 John H. Waterhouse (1870–1948), American businessman and mayor of North Adams, Massachusetts
 John Waterhouse, curator of Monash University Gallery, Melbourne, Australia, in the 1960s

See also
 Jonathan Waterhouse (born 1965), English cricketer
 John Waterhouse Daniel (1845–1933), Canadian physician and Conservative politician